Phanaeus splendidulus is a species of beetles belonging to the family Scarabaeidae.

Description
The female is smaller than the male. It shows a long erect horn recurved towards the tip. The basic body color is bronze-green.

Distribution
This species can be found in Brazil, Uruguay and Argentina.

References

splendidus
Beetles described in 1781